Romina Oprandi was the defending champion, but she decided to compete in Tokyo that week.

Lauren Davis won the title, defeating Shelby Rogers in the final, 6–7(5–7), 6–2, 6–2.

Seeds

Main draw

Finals

Top half

Bottom half

References 
 Main Draw
 Qualifying Draw

Party Rock Open - Singles
Party Rock Open
2012 Party Rock Open